is a Japanese gravure idol and actress. Her debut role was in Cutie Honey: The Live as the lead role of Honey Kisaragi/Cutie Honey.

History

Filmography

TV Drama

Films

References

External links 
 

1987 births
Living people
Actors from Niigata Prefecture
Japanese actresses
Japanese gravure models
Japanese idols
Japanese television personalities
Models from Niigata Prefecture